North Courtland is a town in Lawrence County, Alabama, United States, and is included in the Decatur Metropolitan Area, as well as the Huntsville-Decatur Combined Statistical Area. It incorporated in 1981. At the 2010 census, the population of the town was 632, down from 799 in 2000. Along with Hillsboro, it is one of two majority black communities in Lawrence County out of its six populated communities as of 2010.

Geography

Demographics

At the 2000 census, there were 799 people, 330 households and 206 families residing in the town. The racial makeup of the town was 2.38% White, 97.50% Black or African American and 0.13% Native American. 0.75% of the population were Hispanic or Latino of any race.

There were 330 households, of which 30.6% had children under the age of 18 living with them, 30.3% were married couples living together, 28.5% had a female householder with no husband present, and 37.3% were non-families. 34.5% of all households were made up of individuals, and 13.3% had someone living alone who was 65 years of age or older. The average household size was 2.42 and the average family size was 3.15.

29.0% of the population were under the age of 18, 10.8% from 18 to 24, 26.3% from 25 to 44, 21.7% from 45 to 64, and 12.3% who were 65 years of age or older. The median age was 33 years. For every 100 females, there were 75.2 males. For every 100 females age 18 and over, there were 72.3 males.

The median household income was $19,875 and the median family income was $26,250. Males had a median income of $25,938 compared with $21,058 for females. The per capita income for the town was $12,776. About 19.8% of families and 28.1% of the population were below the poverty line, including 32.6% of those under age 18 and 45.8% of those age 65 or over.

2020 census

As of the 2020 United States census, there were 483 people, 355 households, and 178 families residing in the city.

References

Towns in Lawrence County, Alabama
Decatur metropolitan area, Alabama
Towns in Alabama
Huntsville-Decatur, AL Combined Statistical Area